El Alto (Spanish for "The Heights") is the second-largest city in Bolivia, located adjacent to La Paz in Pedro Domingo Murillo Province on the Altiplano highlands. El Alto is today one of Bolivia's fastest-growing urban centers, with an estimated population of 943,558 in 2020.

The El Alto–La Paz metropolitan area, formed by La Paz, El Alto, Achocalla, Viacha, and Mecapaca, constitutes the most populous urban area of Bolivia, with a population of about 2.2 million.

History
The dry and inclement plain above La Paz was uninhabited until 1903 when the newly built railways from Lake Titicaca and Arica reached the rim of the canyon, where the La Paz terminus, railyards and depots were built along with a settlement of railway workers (a spur line down into the canyon opened in 1905). In 1925, the airfield was built as a base for the new air force, which attracted additional settlement. In 1939, El Alto's first elementary school opened. El Alto started to grow tremendously in the 1950s when the settlement was connected to La Paz's water supply (before this, all water had to be transported from La Paz in tanker vehicles) and building land in the canyon became more and more scarce and expensive. In an administrative reform in March 1985, the district of El Alto and its surroundings were politically separated from the City of La Paz (this date is officially referred to and celebrated as the city's "founding day"). In 1987, El Alto was formally incorporated as a city. In 1994, the city became the seat of the Roman Catholic Diocese of El Alto.

Districts
El Alto's autonomous government identifies 14 districts composing the city.

Demographics
El Alto is the largest city in Latin America with a mostly Indigenous population. About 76% of its inhabitants are Aymara, 9% are Quechua, 15% are Mestizo (descendants of Indigenous and Europeans), and less than 0.1% are Criollos (White).  El Alto was once known as La Paz's bedroom community, though recent growth of commerce and industry has led some local authorities to claim the title of "Bolivia's Economic Capital." With this industrial growth, there is concern about water pollution by businesses, including tanneries and slaughterhouses, for the city and communities downstream. Rapid population growth means the city struggles to bring potable water and sewer service to parts of the population, especially on the fringes of the expanding urban area. Much of the city's roads are unpaved and most citizens do not have access to running water, sewerage, electricity, or garbage collection for their homes.

Geography
The city contains La Paz’s El Alto International Airport. El Alto is one of the highest major cities in the world, up to 4,150 meters (13,615 feet) above mean sea level. It has a cold climate, with the highest average monthly maximum temperature being  in November. It is one of the fastest-growing cities in Bolivia, due to immigration from Bolivia’s rural areas to the La Paz region which started with the rural reform of 1952 and increased in the last 10 years. Some migrants say the difficulty of growing crops in the countryside drove them to move to the city.

Climate
The Köppen climate classification system classifies El Alto's climate as a rare cold-summer variety of a subtropical highland climate (Cwc). Temperatures are typically cool during the day and crisp at night year-round. Snowfall is possible at any time during the year.

The water supply in El Alto has been impacted by drought caused by shrinking glaciers. In 2016 the three main dams supplying water to the city were almost dry due to lack of glacial melt water.

Attractions

Museo de Arte Antonio Paredes Candia opened in 2002. From 2003, access from La Paz to the international airport, as well to oil and gas supplies, has been frequently blocked by protesting social leaders and some of the most powerful players in the politics of Bolivia. El Alto remains one of the major centers of the Bolivian gas conflict.

El Alto is known for its Neo-Andean architecture, built from the mid-2000s onward.

There is a large open-air market.

Gallery

Government
El Alto is a municipality within the province of Murillo. The government of the city is divided into the executive and legislative branches. The mayor of El Alto is the head of the city government, elected for a term of five years by general election. The legislative branch consists of the municipal council, which elects a president, vice president, and secretary from a group of 11 members.

The current mayor is Monica Eva Copa, who defeated MÁS candidate Zacarias Maquera in March 2021 after being ousted by the El Alto party. The previous election was held in March 2021. The Government of El Alto faces competition in providing public services, security and participation with the grassroots and highly successful Fejuve movement.

Transportation
El Alto is connected to La Paz by three lines of the Mi Teleférico system. The city is connected to domestic and international destinations by El Alto International Airport.

See also
List of highest large cities in the world

References

www.ine.gob.bo

Further reading
Lazar, Sian (2008), El Alto, Rebel City, Duke University Press,

External links

Weather in El Alto
El Alto Bolivia at Discover the World
El Alto Bolivia —a blog
Cultura en las Alturas 
INE – Instituto Nacional de Estadística de Bolivia
"My Travels With Pope Francis in Latin America" by Jim Yardley, The New York Times

1985 establishments in Bolivia
Populated places established in 1985
Populated places in La Paz Department (Bolivia)
Populated places in the Altiplano